Gonzalo Alassia (born 13 February 2004) is an Argentine professional footballer who plays as a central midfielder for Atlético de Rafaela.

Career
Alassia, after a spell with hometown club Sportivo Suardi, joined the youth ranks of Atlético de Rafaela at the beginning of 2018. Having spent two years progressing through their academy, the central midfielder was promoted into Walter Otta's first-team squad in December 2020. Alassia made his senior debut on 27 December in a Primera B Nacional home victory over Gimnasia y Esgrima, as he was substituted on in place of Rodrigo Castro with twenty-three minutes remaining.

Career statistics
.

References

External links

2004 births
Living people
People from San Cristóbal Department
Argentine footballers
Association football midfielders
Primera Nacional players
Atlético de Rafaela footballers
Sportspeople from Santa Fe Province